The Cyberiad is a series of humorous science fiction short stories by Polish writer Stanisław Lem, originally published in 1965, with an English translation appearing in 1974. The main protagonists of the series are Trurl and Klapaucius, the "constructors".

The vast majority of characters are either robots or intelligent machines. The stories focus on problems of the individual and society, as well as on the vain search for human happiness through technological means. Two of these stories were included in the book The Mind's I.

The word "Cyberiad" is used in the series only once as a name of a pretty woman in a poem by Elektrybałt, an electronic poet invented by Trurl. There is a steel statue of Elektrybałt in the Copernicus Science Centre, Warsaw.

Stories
The whole series was published in the 1965 Polish collection Cyberiada by Wydawnictwo Literackie and also included stories published previously elsewhere.

 Jak ocalał świat (Bajki robotów Wydawnictwo Literackie 1964), translated as How the World was Saved.
 Maszyna Trurla (Bajki robotów Wydawnictwo Literackie 1964), translated as Trurl's Machine.
 Wielkie lanie (Bajki robotów Wydawnictwo Literackie 1964), translated as A Good Schellacking.
 Bajka o trzech maszynach opowiadających króla Genialona (Cyberiada Wydawnictwo Literackie 1965), translated as Tale of the Three Storytelling Machines of King Genius. Essentially it is a matryoshka of stories. In particular, the tale of "Zipperupus, king of the Partheginians, the Deutons, and the Profligoths" contains several titled stories-in-story presented as dreams from "dreaming cabinets":
 Alacritus the Knight and Fair Ramolda, Daughter of Heteronius
The Marvelous Mattress of Princess Bounce
Bliss in the Eightfold Embrace of Octopauline
Wockle Weed
The Wedding Night of Princess Ineffabelle
 Altruizyna, czyli opowieść prawdziwa o tym, jak pustelnik Dobrycy kosmos uszczęśliwić zapragnął i co z tego wynikło (collection Polowanie Wydawnictwo Literackie 1965), Translated as Altruizine, or A True Account of How Bonhomius the Hermetic Hermit Tried to Bring About Universal Happiness, and What Came of It.
 Kobyszczę (collection Bezsenność Wydawnictwo Literackie 1971)
 Edukacja Cyfrania: (collection Maska Wydawnictwo Literackie 1976)
 Opowieść pierwszego Odmrożeńca
 Opowieść drugiego Odmrożeńca
 Powtórka (collection Powtórka Wydawnictwo Literackie 1979)

Seven Sallies of Trurl and Klapaucius

Polish title: Siedem wypraw Trurla i Klapaucjusza
All these stories were first published in the 1965 Polish collection Cyberiada by Wydawnictwo Literackie.
 Wyprawa pierwsza, czyli pułapka Gargancjana (The first sally, or the trap of Gargantius)
 Wyprawa pierwsza A, czyli Elektrybałt Trurla (The first sally (A), or Trurl's electronic bard)
 Wyprawa druga, czyli oferta króla Okrucyusza (The second sally, or the offer of king Krool)
 Wyprawa trzecia, czyli smoki prawdopodobieństwa (The third sally, or the dragons of probability)
 Wyprawa czwarta, czyli o tym jak Trurl kobietron zastosował, królewicza Pantarktyka od mąk miłosnych chcąc zbawić i jak potem do użycia dzieciomiotu doszło (The fourth sally, or how Trurl built a femfatalatron to save prince Pantagoon from the pangs of love, and how later he resorted to a cannonade of babies)
 Wyprawa piąta, czyli o figlach króla Baleryona (The fifth sally, or the mischief of King Balerion)
 Wyprawa piąta A, czyli konsultacja Trurla (The fifth sally (A), or Trurl's prescription)
 Wyprawa szósta, czyli jak Trurl i Klapaucjusz demona drugiego rodzaju stworzyli, aby zbójcę Gębona pokonać (The sixth sally, or how Trurl and Klapaucius created a demon of the second kind to defeat the pirate Pugg)
 Wyprawa siódma, czyli o tym jak własna doskonałość Trurla do złego przywiodła (The Seventh Sally or How Trurl's Own Perfection Led to No Good)

Trurl and Klapaucius
Trurl and Klapaucius are "wizard robots" — brilliant engineers, also called "constructors" because they can construct practically anything at will — and capable of almost God-like exploits. For instance, on one occasion Trurl creates an entity capable of extracting accurate information from the random motion of gas particles, which he calls a "Demon of the Second Kind". He describes the "Demon of the First Kind" as a Maxwell's demon. On another, the two constructors re-arrange stars near their home planet in order to advertise.

The duo are best friends and rivals. When they are not busy constructing revolutionary mechanisms at home, they travel the universe, aiding those in need. As the characters are firmly established as good and righteous, they take no shame in accepting handsome rewards for their services. If rewards were promised and not delivered, the constructors may even severely punish those who deceived them.

The world and its inhabitants
The universe of The Cyberiad is pseudo-medieval. There are kingdoms, knights, princesses, and even dragons in abundance. Robots are usually anthropomorphic, to the point of being divided into sexes. Love and marriage are possible for them. Physical and mental disabilities, old age and death, particularly in case of accidents or murder, are also common, though mechanical language is used to describe them. Death is theoretically avoidable (by means of repair), and sometimes even reversible.

In fact, the teacher of Trurl and Klapaucius, Master Cerebron, is deceased, but can still be reanimated at his tomb. The level of technology of the vast majority of inhabitants is pseudo-Medieval also, with swords, robotic steeds, and gallows widespread. With this co-exist space travel, extremely advanced technology made by the Constructors and futuristic weapons and devices used or mentioned on occasion. There even exists a civilization that has achieved the "HPLD" – Highest Possible Level of Development.

Romantic stories
Some stories are basically self-conscious parodies of romantic novels about knights, with more profound issues of psychology and social dynamics under a cartoonish and swashbuckling facade. Three of them were published in an earlier collection, Fables for Robots.

A typical example is the fairy tale O królewiczu Ferrycym i królewnie Krystalii ("Prince Ferrix and the Princess Crystal"). A princely (robotic) knight falls in love with a beautiful (robotic) princess. Unfortunately, the princess is somewhat eccentric, and is captivated by stories of an alien non-robotic, "paleface" civilization (the humans). She declares that she will only marry a "paleface". Therefore, the knight decides to masquerade as a paleface. He covers himself with mud, starting to resemble one, and then comes to woo her.

Meanwhile, a real "paleface" captive arrives, given as a gift to the king. It immediately becomes obvious to the princess who is the "muddier" one, but the "paleface" turns out to be too squishy and overall disgusting. Not wanting to back down at the last minute, however, the princess declares a joust between the two suitors to select the worthier one. When the "paleface" charges at the robot, he splatters himself on the latter's metal chest, revealing the metallic body to all. The princess, beholding the beauty of the exposed robot (compared with the ugliness of the "paleface"), changes her mind. The knight and the princess live happily ever after.

Stories involving technology and the Constructors
Most of the stories involve Trurl and Klapaucius using their extraordinary technological abilities to help the inhabitants of the medieval planets, usually involving neutralizing tyrants.

Trurl and Klapaucius come to a planet ruled by a king who loves hunting. He has already "conquered" all the most dangerous of predators, and now hires constructors (engineers) to make new, mighty robotic beasts for him to hunt. He has already executed all of the previous constructors who visited because they could not build beasts that would be challenging enough to hunt. When the two famous Constructors arrive, they are arrested and ordered to construct a worthy foe for the king within twelve days.

The two face a dilemma: if they make something that the king will kill, they will be executed by the mad king. But if the king himself is killed, then they will be executed, for the next king will be pressured to show his respect for the previous. They solve the problem by building an animal that survives the hunt (involving both cyber-hounds and nuclear tipped missiles unleashed upon it, in the characteristic cartoonish manner) and takes the king hostage by, nothing less, turning into several police officers and presenting an order for his arrest. All the king's men fail to find and free the king (partially because in searching for the fake policemen one half of the real police force arrests the other half), and he is released only after the Constructors' numerous demands are met.

On another occasion, Trurl and Klapaucius are captured by an interstellar "PHT" pirate. Trurl offers to build a machine capable of turning hydrogen into gold (something he can do manually, which he demonstrates by hand, mixing up protons and putting electrons around). However, the pirate turns out to have a PhD and cares not for the riches, but for knowledge (and in fact points out that gold becomes cheap if it is abundant). Trurl therefore makes a modified Maxwell's demon for him, an entity that looks at moving particles of gas and reads information that is, coincidentally, encoded in their random perturbations. This way, all the information in the universe becomes easily available. The demon prints out this information on a long paper tape, but before the pirate realizes most of the information is completely useless (although strictly factual) he is buried under the endless rolls of tape, ceasing to bother anyone.

Adaptations
In 1970, Krzysztof Meyer composed Cyberiada – an opera to his own libretto based on selected stories.

The Seventh Sally or How Trurl's Own Perfection Led to No Good (Polish title: Wyprawa siódma, czyli o tym jak własna doskonałość Trurla do złego przywiodła) was adapted as part of the plot for the film Victim of the Brain, there called The Perfect Imitation.

The Seventh Sally was also an inspiration of the game SimCity.

An elaborate interactive Google Doodle inspired by The Cyberiad was created and published in his honor for the 60th anniversary of Lem's first published book: The Astronauts.

Publications

References

External links

 The Cyberiad book page on Stanisław Lem's official site
 One of the stories online 
 
 Interactive film based on the Cyberiad illustrations of Daniel Mróz Google doodle celebrating the 60th anniversary of the publication of Lem's first novel

1965 short story collections
Short story collections by Stanisław Lem
Science fiction comedy
Wydawnictwo Literackie books